Marsh Creek is a  tributary of Pine Creek in Pennsylvania in the United States.

Marsh Creek begins in the borough of Wellsboro, at the confluence of Kelsey Creek, Morris Branch, and Charleston Creek.  Marsh Creek flows north, then west, and joins Pine Creek just downstream of Ansonia in Tioga County.  A small flood in 1993 ruined a marginal amount of farmland.

See also
List of rivers of Pennsylvania

References

External links
U.S. Geological Survey: PA stream gaging stations

Rivers of Pennsylvania
Rivers of Tioga County, Pennsylvania
Tributaries of Pine Creek (Pennsylvania)